Monument to Christopher Columbus may refer to:

 Monument to Christopher Columbus (Buenavista, Mexico City)
 Monument to Christopher Columbus (Buenos Aires), Argentina
 Monument to Christopher Columbus (Galway), Ireland
 Monument to Columbus (Madrid), Spain
 Monument to Christopher Columbus (Paseo de la Reforma), Mexico City
 Monument to Columbus (Salamanca), Spain
 Monument to Columbus (Valladolid), Spain

See also
 Columbus Monument (disambiguation)
 List of monuments and memorials to Christopher Columbus
 Statue of Christopher Columbus (disambiguation)